A Call to Action: Women, Religion, Violence, and Power is a 2014 book by former US president Jimmy Carter. The Pittsburgh Post-Gazette reviewed the book as "a tour de force of the global abuse and manipulation of women" and commended Carter's presentation of statistical data.

References

2014 non-fiction books
American political books
Books by Jimmy Carter
Political science books
Women's rights
Simon & Schuster books
Books written by presidents of the United States